Norwich Park and Ride is a park & ride bus service in the English city of Norwich, East Anglia. The first of the park and rides was opened in the early 1990s at Norwich Airport in Hellesdon, while the sixth (and currently final) site was opened in Thickthorn in  2005. With the addition of the final site, the Norwich Park & Ride became the largest park and ride services in the United Kingdom, and provided the scheme with over 5,000 permanent car parks – at the time the highest number for a park and ride scheme in the country. The scheme was awarded the British Parking Association Park and Ride award in 2004, and in the 2006/2007 financial year, 3.3 million people used the service, keeping 940,000 cars out of the city centre.

Thickthorn Park & Ride
Thickthorn Park & Ride is located near Thickthorn services in Hethersett (NR9 3AU). The site first opened in 2005, making it the newest Park & Ride site in Norwich.

It has 726 car parking spaces and is the only site to open 7 days a week.

Harford Park & Ride
Harford Park & Ride is located on Ipswich Road, Norwich (NR4 6DY), and is accessed via an exit off the Harford Interchange where the A140 meets the A47.

The site has 1088 car parking spaces, including electric vehicle charging points, cycle parking and recycle facilities. A car boot sale is held at the site on a Sunday, when no services are in operation.

In 2015, First Eastern Counties began to operate service 600 which travelled between the site and Norfolk County Hall on weekday mornings and evenings. This service was taken over by Konectbus when the new park and ride contract began in September 2015.

Airport Park & Ride
Airport Park & Ride is located on Buck Courtney Crescent, next to the entrance to Norwich Airport. The site has 620 spaces and is open Monday to Saturday. The site also has facilities for recycling and electric vehicle charging.

Costessey Park & Ride
Costessey Park & Ride is located next to the Royal Norfolk Showground in Costessey, Norwich. It has 1,100 spaces and is open Monday to Friday. From September 2015, it became the only site which has no service to the City Centre at all. Services instead run from the site to the Norfolk and Norwich University Hospital and The University of East Anglia only.

Postwick Park & Ride

Postwick site is located on Yarmouth Road at the junction with the A47 road NR13 5NP. It's open Monday to Saturday. It has 552 car parking spaces (Services currently suspended as site is currently being used as a drive through COVID testing site)

Sprowston Park & Ride

Sprowston site is located on Wroxham Road. It opens Monday-Saturday and has 792 spaces. A boot sale takes place there on Sundays.

2005-2010 contract
Between 2005-2010 the sites were managed and operated by three companies:
First Eastern Counties operated the Harford Park & Ride with blue livery Dennis Trident 2 double deckers and Sprowston with purple Wright Eclipse Urban single deckers
Konectbus operated the Thickthorn Park & Ride with pink liveried Wright Eclipse Gemini bodied double deckers and Costessey with green Optare Tempo single deckers
Norse operated the Airport Park & Ride with yellow Irisbus Agora Line single deckers and Postwick with red Irisbus Agora Line single deckers

2010-2015 contract
From 2010 until September 2015, the Harford, Thickthorn and Costessey sites are operated by Konectbus, and Sprowston, Postwick and Airport by Norse.

Konectbus purchased a fleet of Alexander Dennis Enviro400 double deckers painted in a blue livery to operate the Harford contract. Pink livery Wright Eclipse Gemini double deckers operate the Thickthorn service, while ex London General articulated Mercedes-Benz Citaro buses run between the Costessey site, the University of East Anglia and the city centre.

Norse operated a fleet of Plaxton President bodied double deckers to operate all their services, with Airport having a light blue livery and Postwick and Sprowston sites being merged, operating via the city centre and Norfolk County Hall.

2015 contract
On 7 September 2015, Konectbus commenced a contract to operate all six park & ride service for a five-year period. A fleet of 18 Alexander Dennis Enviro400s painted in a new green livery were purchased.

Current Routes

Service 5
Postwick Park & Ride
City Centre
County Hall
Service 501
Thickthorn Park & Ride
City Centre
Airport Park & Ride
Service 502
Harford Park & Ride
City Centre
Sprowston Park & Ride
Service 510
Costessey Park & Ride
N&N Hospital
Service 511
Costessey Park & Ride
UEA

Proposed development

Expansion of Postwick site
It is proposed to add 500 places to the Postwick site as part of the Postwick Hub development which is associated with the Norwich Northern Distributor Road development.

Incidents
In May 2011, a Norse double decker operating on the Postwick park and ride service, caught fire on the A47. The bus was completely destroyed by flames after suffering an engine failure. Passengers were evacuated by the driver after stopping the vehicle on a roundabout, before the Broadland Business Park. Nobody was injured. Bus operator Norse, found the rest of the fleet to be in good working order

In January 2013, passengers on board an Airport Park and Ride bus operated by Norse were evacuated while at the Airport Park and Ride site after the double decker bus caught fire. According to witnesses, black smoke was seen billowing from a vent above the drivers seat. Fire crews had extinguished the blaze within ten minutes and the bus remained in a decent condition.

References

External links
Norfolk County Council
Flickr gallery

Bus transport brands
Park and ride schemes in the United Kingdom
Transport in Norfolk
Transport in Norwich